Delirium is a common and severe neuropsychiatric syndrome.

Delirium may also refer to:

Film  
 Delirium (1979 film), a 1979 American thriller film
 Delirium (1987 film), a film by Lamberto Bava
 Delirium (2013 film), a film by Ihor Podolchak
 Delirium (2014 film), an Argentine film
  Delirium (2016 film), a film by Welsh director Gareth Jones
 Delirium (2018 film), a film by Dennis Iliadis

Literature
Novels
 Delirium (Cooper novel), a 1998 Izzy Darlow novel by Douglas Anthony Cooper
 Delirium (Oliver novel), a 2011 novel by Lauren Oliver
 Delirium (Restrepo novel), a 2004 novel by Laura Restrepo
Other publications
 Delirium (comics), a character in The Sandman

Music 
 Delirium (band), an Italian progressive rock band
 Delirium (Capercaillie album), 1991
 Delirium (Ellie Goulding album), 2015
 Delirium (Lacuna Coil album) and the title track, 2016
 Delirium (Sedes album), 1997
 Delirium (Wrathchild album), 1989
 "Delirium" (song), a 2004 song by Lena Philipsson
 "Delirium", a 1995 song by Onkel Tom Angelripper
 "Delirium", a 2003 song by Pink from her album Try This
 "My Delirium", a 2008 song by Ladyhawke
 Delerium, a Canadian band
 Delerium Records, an American record label
 Delirium Records, an independent record label

Other 
 Delirium (Cirque du Soleil), a Cirque du Soleil production
 Delirium (ride), an amusement ride at Kings Island
 Delirium (Kings Dominion), an amusement ride at Kings Dominion
 Delirium Wilderness, Michigan, United States

See also
 Delirium tremens
 Delirium Tremens (disambiguation)
 Delirious (disambiguation)